Seven West Media Limited is an ASX-listed media company and is Australia's largest diversified media business, with an extensive presence in broadcast television, print and online publishing.

Seven Group Holdings Ltd (SGH), a company controlled by Australian Capital Equity, is Seven West Media's largest shareholder, with over $1 billion in Seven West Media shares and $250 million of Seven West Media convertible preference shares (CPS). 

Seven West Media owns the Seven Network, Australia's second largest commercial television network (by audience and advertising market share). It also owns The West Australian, The Sunday Times and the Community Newspaper Group.

On 21 February 2011, Seven Media Group announced its intention to merge with West Australian Newspapers Holdings Limited (WAN). WAN purchased Seven Media Group from Seven Group Holdings and partner U.S. private equity firm Kohlberg Kravis Roberts, and announced the new company would be known as "Seven West Media". On 11 April 2011, the acquisition was approved by WAN shareholders. On 21 May 2013, Kohlberg Kravis Roberts sold its remaining 12% stake in Seven West Media.

In May 2020, Seven West Media sold Pacific Magazines to Bauer Media Group, including leading lifestyle brands Marie Claire, Women's Health, Who, New Idea and Home Beautiful.

In February 2021, both Google and Facebook in Australia made deals with Seven West Media for the latter to provide news coverage. These agreements came after the government planned to implement a law "that would force tech companies to pay news outlets for content" to ensure that digital platforms would provide a "contribution to the sustainability of the Australian news industry".

History

The West Australian

The newspaper was owned by the publicly listed company West Australian Newspapers Ltd (WAN) from the 1920s. In 1969, the Melbourne-based The Herald and Weekly Times Ltd (HWT) bought WAN and published the paper until 1987, when Rupert Murdoch's News Corporation acquired HWT. News sold WAN to Robert Holmes à Court's Bell Group in 1987 The following year Alan Bond, through Bond Corporation, gained control of Bell Group and hence the paper. This ownership structure survived only for a few years until the collapse of Bond Corporation. A newly formed company, West Australian Newspapers Holdings, then purchased the paper from the receivers before being floated in an oversubscribed $185 million public offering.

In September 2007, WAN sold a 50% interest in the Hoyts Cinemas Group.

Kerry Stokes acquired 14.9% through Seven Network and he became chairman of West Australian Newspapers in 2009. Kerry Stokes appointed Chris Wharton as CEO of West Australian Newspapers and Brett McCarthy as Editor.

Seven Media Group
Seven Network (commonly known as Channel 7 or simply Seven) dates back to 4 November 1956, when the first stations on the VHF7 frequency were established in Melbourne and Sydney. The Seven Network is one of five main free-to-air networks in Australia.

Origin
The Seven Network began as a group of independent stations in Sydney, Melbourne, Brisbane, Adelaide and Perth. HSV-7 Melbourne, licensed to The Herald and Weekly Times Ltd (owners of two local papers at the time, The Herald and The Sun), was the first station in the country to use the VHF7 frequency. It launched on 4 November 1956, soon joined on 2 December by Amalgamated Television Services ATN-7 in Sydney.

TVW-7 Perth began broadcasting almost two years later, on 16 October 1959, as the city's first commercial station. It was licensed to TVW7, a subsidiary of West Australian Newspapers, publisher of The West Australian. BTQ-7 followed on 1 November, signing on as Brisbane's second commercial television station. In 1969 the Melbourne based Herald and Weekly times group purchased WA Newspapers . The HWT group already owned HSV 7 and ADS 7 and under the media laws of the time was required to sell TVW 7. A new company was formed and floated on the Perth Stock Exchange, TVW Enterprises Pty Ltd. 

ADS-7 in Adelaide launched on 24 Oct 1959 as the final capital city VHF7 station. TVW Enterprises purchased Adelaide’s SAS 10 in 1971. In 1987 ADS 7 station swapped frequencies with SAS-10,  with the latter becoming SAS-7.

1980s ownership changes
Perth-based businessman Robert Holmes à Court, through his business the Bell Group, completed a takeover on TVW Enterprises in 1982. The Herald and Weekly Times, owner of HSV-7 and ADS-7, was sold to Rupert Murdoch in December 1986. Murdoch's company, News Limited, sold off HSV to Fairfax soon afterwards, for $320 million, while ADS 7 was sold to Frank Lowys Northern Star ( owners of the 10 Network stations in Sydney and Melbourne). Fairfax went on to axe a number of locally produced shows in favour of networked content from its Sydney counterpart, ATN-7 (also owned by Fairfax at the time).

In 1987, Fairfax sold off its stations to Qintex Ltd., owned by businessman Christopher Skase. Qintex had previously bought, and subsequently sold off, stations in Brisbane and regional Queensland before taking control of the network. The next year, another new logo was introduced along with evening soap opera Home and Away and a relaunched Seven National News, now known as Seven News. The network expanded in 1988 when Skase bought out Bell Groups two stations for $130 million creating the first owned and operated national network of the five mainland city Channel 7 stations.

A failed $1.5 billion bid for MGM Studios in the same year sent Qintex into receivership. Christopher Skase fled Australia in 1990 in order to escape extradition. The business' assets were bundled together by receivers and made into a new company, the Seven Network Limited, in 1991.

Advent of Kerry Stokes
The network was re-listed as a public company on the stock exchange in 1993 with News Limited holding 14.9% and Telstra holding 10%. In 1995, Stokes acquired 19.9% of the public company and was elected chairman. He asked Alan Jackson to be it’s CEO for a number of years in the late 1990s. Shortly after it acquired Sunshine Television, a Seven Network affiliate in regional Queensland, Sunshine Television's regional stations effectively became a part of the Seven Network, identical in appearance and programming to the rest of the business' stations. Seven Queensland won the annual audience ratings for the first time in 1998.

The year 2000 saw Seven as the host broadcaster for the Sydney Olympics. The Network adopted a new logo. In 2003, Stokes appointed David Leckie as CEO of Seven and Peter Meakin as Head of News and Current Affairs. In January 2006, the Seven Network, Pacific Magazine and online portal Yahoo! Australia and New Zealand combined in a joint venture to form Yahoo!7, representing all three companies' online assets. This venture is now Australia's most popular internet portal  and the joint venture is driving a range of online and IPTV businesses. Seven is building and acquiring a range of broadband businesses, including wireless broadband group Unwired, VOIP operator Engin and has become the Australian licensee for TiVo, due to be launched in 2008. The group has also established a strategic 20 per cent shareholding in West Australian Newspapers Ltd.

Since 2007, the Seven Network has been the highest rating television network in Australia, ahead of the Nine Network, Network Ten, ABC and SBS. In 2011, the Seven Network won all 40 out of 40 weeks of the ratings season for total viewers. Seven is the first to do this since the introduction of the OZtam ratings system in 2001.  it was the second largest network in the country in terms of population reach.

68% owned by Kerry Stokes, Seven Network is a network of commercial free-to-air television stations in Sydney, Melbourne, Brisbane and Adelaide, as well as regional Queensland and Perth. The platform, as well as a 33 per cent stake in Sky News Australia, now reaches 98 per cent of Australians. Seven has also established a major magazine publishing business, Pacific Magazines which, accounted for more than 20 per cent of magazines sold in Australia.

In 2006, Seven Network and Kohlberg Kravis Roberts & Co (KKR) created a new joint venture, Seven Media Group, a multi-faceted media company combining a presence in broadcast television, magazine and online applications.

7HD was officially announced on 15 September 2007, with the Seven Media Group announcing its intention to start a high definition multichannel. By the end of 2007, the Seven Network had become the most watched network in the country, dominating morning and prime time slots.

Key people 
The Chairman of Seven West Media is Kerry Stokes AC, who is also chairman of Seven Group Holdings.

On 26 June 2012, Seven West Media announced former Nine Network executive David Leckie's transition from chief executive officer of Seven West Media to a new role as executive director, media for Seven Group Holdings.

Don Voelte, the former managing director and CEO of Woodside and a director of Seven West Media, was appointed CEO and managing director of Seven West Media. He subsequently stepped down to become managing director and chief executive officer of Seven Group Holdings and was replaced by Tim Worner who became the CEO.

Assets

Television
 Seven Network is an Australian commercial free-to-air television primary channel
 ATN Sydney
 HSV Melbourne
 BTQ Brisbane
 SAS Adelaide
 TVW Perth
 STQ Regional Queensland
 CBN Southern New South Wales and the ACT
 NEN Northern New South Wales and the Gold Coast
 AMV Regional Victoria
 PTV Mildura
 GWN Regional Western Australia
 7HD is an Australian free-to-air HD digital television multichannel using the primary channel simulcast.
 7two is an Australian free-to-air digital television multichannel suitable for people 55+
 7mate is an Australian free-to-air digital television multichannel aimed at men 16-54-year-olds.
 7Bravo is an Australian free-to-air digital television multichannel featuring reality and true crime programs and co-owned with NBCUniversal
 7flix is an Australian free-to-air digital television multichannel featuring kids, family programs and movies.
 Racing.com is an Australian free-to-air standard definition digital television channel co-owned and co-operated with Racing Victoria.
 7plus is a video on demand, catch-up TV service which carries the main and multichannels of the Seven Network.

News and other
bloo Western Australian business search and website advertising project
Community Newspaper Group
 67% of Hybrid Television Services exclusive licensee of TiVo in Australia and New Zealand from 2008.
The West Australian
The Sunday Times
Wjobs
 23 regional newspapers and magazines
 4 business directories across the State
 the Streetsmart and Travellers Atlas street directories
 the quarterly Vita and Habitat & Lifestyle magazines
 The Quokka, a classified-advertising weekly
 Two commercial printing plants
 a regional radio network in the state's north

References

External links
 

Television broadcasting companies of Australia
Australian companies established in 1992
Companies based in Perth, Western Australia
Companies listed on the Australian Securities Exchange
Seven Network
Mass media companies established in 1992